Kiang Nangbah Government College, established in 1967, is a general Degree College situated at Ladthadlaboh, Jowai, in Meghalaya, India. This college is affiliated with the North Eastern Hill University. This college offers bachelor's degree courses in Arts, Science and Commerce.

References

Universities and colleges in Meghalaya
Colleges affiliated to North-Eastern Hill University
Educational institutions established in 1967